Göran Herman Hultin (15 May 1897 – 12 September 1949) was a Swedish athlete. He competed at the 1920 Summer Olympics in the 110 m hurdles, but failed to reach the final.

References

1897 births
1949 deaths
Swedish male hurdlers
Athletes (track and field) at the 1920 Summer Olympics
Olympic athletes of Sweden
Sportspeople from Gävleborg County
20th-century Swedish people